The Kenya Cricket Association President's Cup was a three team ODI cricket tournament that was held in Kenya during the 1997–98 season.

Squads

Schedule

Points table

Group matches

1st match

2nd match

3rd match

4th match

5th match

6th match

Final series

1st final

2nd final

The finals took place between Zimbabwe, who were unbeaten throughout the qualifying games, and Kenya. The series was a best of three games and Zimbabwe lifted the trophy after winning the first two finals. It was Zimbabwe's first silverware since receiving Test status in 1992.

In the first final, Alistair Campbell won the toss and sent Kenya into field. Openers Grant and Andy Flower put on 154 for the first wicket to help Zimbabwe to 281 for 8 from their 50 overs. Campbell chipped in with a half century and for Kenya Steve Tikolo took 3/41. Kenya could only manage 172 in reply despite 67 from Maurice Odumbe in the middle order. Guy Whittall and Grant Flower took a couple of wickets each.

Campbell won the toss in the second final and again decided to bat first. This time it was the 3rd wicket partnership that set up the Zimbabwean innings, with Grant Flower and Gavin Rennie putting on 150 runs. Both scored 70s and Zimbabwe finished with 6 for 272. Kenya lost their first 3 wickets to Man of the Match Andy Whittall and were never in the hunt. At one stage they were at 7/71 but Aasif Karim scored his maiden ODI half century and put on a 100 run partnership with Hitesh Modi who also scored a 50. Kenya were eventually dismissed for 190 with Paul Strang joining Whittall on 3 wickets.

External links
Cricket Archive 

International cricket competitions from 1997–98 to 2000
Kenyan cricket seasons to 1999–2000
Sport in Nairobi
1998 in Kenyan cricket
International cricket competitions in Kenya
1997 in Kenyan cricket